Hamida Pahalwan (7 April 1907 – 12 April 1984) was a Pakistani wrestler. He was the former Rustam-i-Hind and one of the elite champions of the British Raj.

Early life
Hamida Pahalwan was born during the British Raj in 1907. He started his training at the age of six in Radhanpur and earned title of Rustam-i-Hind during 1930s. He worked as an official wrestler for the Nawab Jalaluddin of Radhanpur and also trained Aslam Pahalwan. Following partition, he went to Lahore, Pakistan and remained there until his death in 1984.

Death
He died on April 12, 1984 in Lahore, Pakistan.
Hamida Pahalwan was the maternal uncle of the Bholu Brothers of Pakistan. He was the trainer of Bholu Pahalwan and Aslam Pahalwan.

References

People from Gujarat
1907 births
1984 deaths
Pakistani wrestlers
20th-century professional wrestlers